Pyriprole (trade name Prac-tic) is for veterinary use on dogs against external parasites such as fleas and ticks.

Pyriprole is a phenylpyrazole derivative similar to fipronil. Although recently introduced (in the 2000s) and still under patent protection it is a "classic" insecticide. So far it is only approved in the EU and a few other countries for use on dogs. It is not approved for use on cats or livestock. It has not been introduced as an agricultural or hygiene pesticide.

Pyriprole applied as a spot-on is highly effective against fleas and several ticks species. Efficacy against fleas is comparable to that of other modern insecticidal active ingredients such as fipronil, imidacloprid or spinosad. As most flea spot-ons it controls existing flea and tick infestations in about 1 to 2 days, and provides about 4 weeks protection against re-infestations.

Mechanism of action
Pyriprole is an insecticide and acaricide. It inhibits γ-aminobutyric acid (GABA)-gated chloride channels (GABAA receptors) resulting in uncontrolled hyperactivity of the central nervous system of fleas and ticks.

Parasites are killed through contact rather than by systemic exposure. Following topical administration pyriprole is rapidly distributed in the hair coat of dogs within one day after application. It can be found in the hair coat throughout the treatment interval. Insecticidal efficacy duration against new infestations with fleas persists for a minimum of four weeks. The substance can be used as part of a treatment strategy for the control of flea allergy dermatitis (FAD).

Warnings
Do not use in dogs less than 8 weeks of age or with a body weight of less than 2 kg. Do not use in case of known hypersensitivity to phenylpyrazole class compounds or any of the excipients. Do not use on sick (e.g. systemic diseases, fever) or convalescent animals. This product is specifically developed for dogs. Do no use in cats, as this could lead to overdosing. Do not use on rabbits. The drug is for spot-on application only. Do not administer orally or via any other route.

References 

Insecticides
2-Pyridyl compounds
Pyrazoles
Nitriles
Organofluorides
Trifluoromethyl compounds
Thioethers
Chlorobenzenes
Synthetic insecticides